Christopher Francis Puttock (born 1954), often cited as C.F.Puttock, is an Australian botanist and taxonomist who has interests in the Rubiaceae and Asteraceae flowering plant families as well as Pteridophyta (ferns) and Rhodophyta (red algae).

Career
Puttock has done field work in Australia, Malaysia, Sri Lanka and South Africa, and museum studies in Hawaii, mainland United States, Europe, Australia and Asia.

He has held the following positions:
 Research Assistant, Macquarie University, Sydney, NSW (1978-1979).
 Research Assistant, (Electron Microscopist), Sydney University, Sydney, NSW (1979-1981).
 Technical Officer, University of NSW, Sydney, NSW (1981-1988).
 Senior Technical Officer, University of NSW, Sydney, NSW (1988-1992).
 Research Scientist. Australian Nature Conservation Agency (now known as Parks Australia), Canberra, ACT (1992-?).
 Research Associate, Smithsonian Institution.

Selected publications

Legacy
C.F. Puttock is the authority for 47 taxa. Following is a list of existing Wikipedia articles . For a comprehensive list of all taxa authored by Puttock, see his profile at IPNI.

References 

1954 births
Living people
20th-century Australian botanists
21st-century Australian botanists